Fall Leaf is an unincorporated community in Leavenworth County, Kansas, United States.  It is part of the Kansas City metropolitan area.

History
A post office called Fall Leaf was established in 1868, and remained in operation until it was discontinued in 1894. The community was named for a Delaware chief.

References

Further reading

External links
 Leavenworth County maps: Current, Historic, KDOT

Unincorporated communities in Leavenworth County, Kansas
Unincorporated communities in Kansas